n Beetje Verliefd (official English title: Happy Family, literal translation: a little in love) is a 2006 Dutch comedy film directed by Martin Koolhoven. The film received a Golden Film award since the film sold 100,000 tickets. For Koolhoven, the film meant his third hit movie within two years.

Cast
 Ad van Kempen as Thijs
 Geert de Jong as Jacky
 Yes-R as Omar
 Fatma Genç as Meral
 Tjitske Reidinga as Aafke
 Plien van Bennekom as Vonne
 Sabri Saad el Hamus as Tarik
 Sadik Eksi as Erhan
 Luk D'Heu as Jeff
 Frieda Pittoors as Maria
 Gene Bervoets as Guy
 Helmert Woudenberg as Dokter
 Yahya Gaier as Ab
 Sedat Mert as	Adem

References

External links

Dutch comedy films
2006 films
2000s Dutch-language films
2006 comedy films
Films about dysfunctional families
Films directed by Martin Koolhoven